Çorlu is a district in Tekirdağ Province, Turkey.

Çorlu may also refer to:

People
 Çorlulu Ali Pasha (1670-1711), Ottoman grand vizier
 Nilüfer Çınar Çorlulu (born 1962), Turkish Woman International Master of chess
 Şenol Çorlu (born 1958), retired Turkish football player

Places
 Çorlu, Karaisalı, a village in Karaisalı district of Adana Province, Turkey
 Lernantsk, formerly Chorlu, a town in Lori Province of Armenia

Other uses
 Tekirdağ Çorlu Airport, a regional airport in Çorlu, tekirdağ, Turkey

Turkish-language surnames